Stenoma hypocirrha is a moth in the family Depressariidae. It was described by Edward Meyrick in 1930. It is found in Brazil.

The wingspan is about 35 mm. The forewings are white and the hindwings are pale whitish ochreous. The forewings and hindwings are whitish yellowish beneath.

References

Moths described in 1930
Taxa named by Edward Meyrick
Stenoma